Vålerengens Idrettsforening is a Norwegian multi-sports club from the neighbourhood Vålerenga in Oslo, founded on 29 July 1913.

It has sections for football, ice hockey, american football, handball, floorball and skiing. The football team, ice hockey team and the american football team are all multiple national champions.

Former sports include athletics, bandy, basketball and wrestling. The club became national champions in bandy for women in 1984, 1986, 1987, and 1988.

The board of directors of Vålerengens IF is chaired by Stein Morisse.

Major clubs

Vålerenga Ishockey

Vålerenga Ishockey is the most successful club in Norway and the ice hockey club in Scandinavia with most titles, with 29 regular season titles and 26 playoff championships. They play their home games at Jordal Amfi, close to the neighborhood where the club was established.

Vålerenga Fotball

The association football club has won five league titles since the club was founded in 1913. They play their home games at Intility Arena.

Other clubs

Vålerenga Trolls
Vålerenga Trolls is the American football department of the club. They play their games at Jordal Idrettspark.

Vålerenga Sjakklubb
Vålerenga Sjakklubb, also known as Vålerenga Sjakk, is the chess department of the club. In March 2018, the current world champion, Magnus Carlsen, joined the club. Vålerenga Sjakklubb will participate in the 2018 European Chess Club Cup.

References

External links

 
Sports teams in Norway
Association football clubs established in 1913
Bandy clubs established in 1913
Ice hockey clubs established in 1913
Defunct athletics clubs in Norway
Defunct bandy clubs in Norway
Norwegian handball clubs
Sport in Oslo
1913 establishments in Norway
Multi-sport clubs in Norway